Do Cheshmeh is a village in Miyan Darband Rural District, in the Central District of Kermanshah County, Kermanshah Province, Iran. At the 2006 census, its population was 45, in 9 families.

References 

Populated places in Kermanshah County